is a free-to-play online action role-playing game in the Phantasy Star series, developed and published by Sega. It was created as a successor to Phantasy Star Online and Phantasy Star Universe, Phantasy Star Online 2 features gameplay elements and aesthetics reminiscent of previous Phantasy Star games while incorporating a few unique twists on the formula. The first version was released for Windows in Japan in July 2012.

A PlayStation Vita version was released in February 2013, but shut down in September 2020. A PlayStation 4 version was released in April 2016. A spin-off/companion game,  was released for Android and iOS in 2014. A cloud version for Nintendo Switch, entitled  was released in April 2018 and then on PC, released in December 2018. At E3 2019, it was announced that the game would be releasing outside of Asia for the first time on the Xbox One and Windows in early 2020.

A massive updated and separate "shared universe" game,  ( in the cloud version), was released on June 9, 2021. It was released for Windows, Xbox One and Xbox Series X/S worldwide, with the PlayStation 4 version releasing on August 31, 2022, and for Windows (download and cloud), Nintendo Switch (cloud) and PlayStation 4 in Japan. Although it was released nearly a decade after Phantasy Star Online 2 launch and is substantially different in gameplay, graphics, and content, the creators decided to not name it "Phantasy Star Online 3" or focus on creating a game with no backwards compatibility with PSO2 content in order to continue support for current players and to not split up the player-base between two different simultaneously available games.

The game is a commercial success, making over 900 million dollars since its release in 2012.

Gameplay

Characters 
Upon starting the game, the player can select one of several servers, known as "Ships", to play. Players create and customize their characters to be used in the game. The name, gender, race, character class, body and facial features are available for customization during the character creation process, and later, the player can acquire a number of accessories and aesthetic goods to further customize their characters. There are various races available to the players in the game, which include Human, Newman (bio-engineered humanoid elves), CAST (cyborgs), and Deuman (a species that didn't originally exist but due to time-travel was retroactively created in the past that contains recessive genetically engineered Draconian genes in them).

At the start of the game, players may select from one of nine starting classes, each with unique stat spreads and weapon specialties. Four more "Scion Classes" can also be unlocked when the player meets certain requirements. Classes can be changed at will in the game's lobby; levels and statistics earned with a specific Class are independent of progress made with other Classes on the same character. Classes can also be customized with Skill Points earned from leveling up, which can be spent on a Skill Tree to learn Skills unique to the Class; Skill abilities can range from passive effects such as boosting stats to toggle abilities that power up your character temporarily. After a certain level, players can also assign a Subclass, a secondary Class that augments the player's Main Class by granting access to most of its Skills, Photon Arts, and Techniques.

Interface
The user interface and controls are similar between the PC, PS Vita, PS4, Switch and Xbox One. By default, players can play the PC version using a mouse and a keyboard, but may also play the game using an Xbox 360 Controller, which the game supports natively. The player's Character name, Health (HP) and Photon Points (PP) are displayed at the bottom left corner of the screen. At the bottom of the screen, the sub-palette may contain consumable items, class active skills, Techniques and Photon Blast skills. The mini-map is located at the top-right corner of the screen. When a target is acquired, the top-left corner of the screen displays the information and status of the target.

The chat log displays messages left by players and NPCs, as well as system messages. Chat commands can customize text in many ways, such as changing the colors of the text, the font, or using special speech bubbles and animations. The player can also create and display Symbol Arts, images made within the game out of various symbolic objects, or uploaded by the player. Autowords can also be created for a character to react to certain events in battle automatically, such as dying, engaging in combat or successfully completing a mission.

Gameplay
Gameplay in Phantasy Star Online 2 is mostly action-oriented, and features a large and diverse selection of weapon types and playstyles for the player to choose from.

In combat, players engage enemies in real-time with various attacks; attacks can be chained for additional damage. In addition to standard attacks, combos can be augmented with powerful attacks called Photon Arts that use a resource called Photon Points (PP). Certain Classes have the ability to use Techniques, attacks similar to magic, that also use PP. PP is consumed whenever the player uses these attacks; the player cannot attack with Photon Arts or Techniques if they do not have sufficient PP, but PP naturally restores on its own or can be recovered manually by attacking enemies with standard attacks.

In some areas of the game, Photons can be generated by defeating enemies to fill up the Photon level in the environment. In return, Photon-sensitive effects (PSE) can provide bonuses to the players in that area. When one of these effects reaches the maximum level of 8, an event known as PSE Burst can occur where many enemies will rapidly spawn for a limited time. This can be further extended by causing a different PSE Burst to form a Cross Burst, which can be extended for a lengthy period of time.

Upon reaching a certain level, each player will be granted their own Mag, a small droid that hovers around the owner of it. Mags can be fed a variety of items in order to strengthen and eventually evolve them. In addition to enhancing the player's stats, a mag will support the player with abilities such as healing or buffing under certain circumstances. Mags also enable the Photon Blast ability, in which the player and mag summon a Photon-based avatar for a brief time to attack enemies or support party members, depending on the type of mag. Photon Blasts can only be used after defeating a certain number of enemies and generating enough Photon energy to fill up its power gauge.

Phantasy Star Online 2: New Genesis focuses on an open world field, rather than actual dungeons in the original. Players will be able to explore the field by using Photon Dash and Photon Glide to find hidden secrets around each of the 2 main sectors: Exploration Sectors and Combat Sectors. Exploration Sectors are areas that in which they can obtain food to get boosts and materials to upgrade weapons and armor. Combat Sectors are areas that in which players can defeat enemies and complete trials to fill up the PSE Burst gauge, which are followed by a PSE Burst Climax, which summons a boss enemy. Class Points can be obtained by completing Cocoon Quests and Tower Quests.

Synopsis

Setting 
The game's story primarily focuses on the exploits of the space-faring organization known as Oracle, who uses Photons to traverse the universe and seek new planets for potential colonization while simultaneously suppressing the threat of the Falspawn, alien beings created by evil entities known as Dark Falz that only exist to destroy the universe. Oracle is split between a Mothership, housing the fleet's central core, and a massive fleet of spaceships that contains all civilian entities and the fleet's prime military and exploration department known as ARKS (Artificial Relicit to Keep Species).

Initially, ARKS is sent to investigate activity on three planets: Naverius, a planet whose ecosystem was primarily forest before much of the planet became locked in eternal winter, Lillipa, a desert planet inhabited by rabbit-like natives known as "Lillipans", and Amduskia, a bifurcated planet with a volcanic core surrounded by a mass of floating islands inhabited by humanoid dragonfolk. Later story arcs feature the planet Wopal, an ocean planet, and Harukotan, a planet in the shape of a taijitu inhabited by two opposing races. In EPISODE 4, exploration expands to encompass a fictional counterpart of Earth located in an alternate dimension, and in EPISODE 5, an alternate dimension known as "Omega" located within a black hole becomes the focal point of the story.

Phantasy Star Online 2: New Genesis takes place 1,000 years after the events of Phantasy Star Online 2. The game's story takes place in the planet, Halpha. A new generation of ARKS are Meteorns, people who have landed to a planet via a drop pod, who had advanced techniques, using Photons, to run faster, jump higher and glide between distances. They are also sworn to fight a new enemy, the DOLLS.

Story

Phantasy Star Online 2

Oracle Arc

Episode 1 
The story follows the player character, a graduating member of the ARKS Cadet program, and their partner Afin. During their graduation exercise on Naverius, the Cadets are attacked by the Falspawn, forcing ARKS veterans Zeno and Echo to arrive and rescue the player and Afin. Upon arriving on the ARKS Ship, the player encounters a woman named Xion, who grants the player a Divergence Matrix, an artifact with the ability to alter fate. Returning to Naverius to investigate the Falspawn, the player rescues a girl named Matoi, who has apparent amnesia, and sends her to the ARKS Ship to recover.

The player is sent out to various planets to investigate Falspawn activity. During their travels, they discover the fragments weapon called the Clarissa, one of a series of weapons known as a Cosmogenic Arm, and collect its pieces while being pursued by a mysterious foe called "Persona". The player successfully gathers the Clarissa fragments and entrusts the weapon to weaponsmith Zig for repairs, but the weapon is stolen by ARKS operatives Gettemhult and Melphonsena. The player, Zeno, and Echo pursue them to Naverius, where Gettemhult revives Dark Falz [Elder] and is subsequently possessed. Zeno stays behind to allow the player, Echo, and Melphonsena to escape and is presumed dead.

Episode 2 
Returning to the ARKS Ship, the player and Xion meet Luther, the leader of ARKS and last member of an ancient race known as the "Photoners". During a visit to Wopal, the player witnesses Luther manipulating and recruiting Theodore, an ARKS member who was driven insane by the death of his girlfriend Ulku. The player travels to Amduskia to meet Xiao, an imperfect clone of Xion, and is granted the ability to time travel to disrupt Luther's plans by rescuing Zeno and Ulku in the past.

Xion urges the player and Matoi to head to the Mothership to rescue her, but the duo are branded traitors of ARKS by Regius, a member of an elite ARKS unit called the Six Pillars, and are hunted down by fellow ARKS. The player and Matoi discover that Luther plans to assimilate Xion and gain omniscience. The duo, aided by other members of the Six Pillars and Ulku, rescues Theodore and presses on to the Mothership's core, where Xion convinces the party to kill her. Luther, enraged by his loss, transforms into Dark Falz [Luther] and possesses the Mothership. Xiao rescues the Oracle fleet by manifesting another Mothership and the party escapes. ARKS confronts and defeats Dark Falz [Luther], and his body is consumed by another Dark Falz, Dark Falz [Gemini].

Episode 3 
Xiao soon sends the player and Matoi to the planet Harukotan to investigate [Gemini]'s suspicious activity. While there, the duo befriend Sukuna-hime, a local deity, and together they fend off [Gemini]'s attacks. Due to civil war brewing on the planet, Sukuna-hime decides to confront the Nightfaller King, but she is ambushed by [Gemini] and the player and Matoi and are consumed while trying to save her. While in [Gemini], they discover that Luther has survived by being consumed by [Gemini], and he reveals that [Gemini] wants to revive the [Profound Darkness], an ancient enemy of the Photoners and the progenitor of the Dark Falz. The player and Matoi escape and confront [Gemini], but as they are dying [Gemini] infects Matoi with a large quantity of F-Factor, causing her to become a new [Profound Darkness].

The player is confronted by [Persona], revealed to be an alternate timeline counterpart of the player, and is coerced into killing Matoi to stop the [Profound Darkness]. However, it is revealed that by doing so, the player becomes the next [Persona]. With the aid of the Divergence Matrix, the player gathers their allies and tries to stop Matoi without killing her; [Persona], moved by the player's willingness to change fate, intervenes and absorbs Matoi's F-Factor, becoming the [Profound Darkness] in her stead. ARKS subsequently confronts and temporarily kills the [Profound Darkness]. However, since it cannot truly be killed the last part of [Persona] forcefully binds himself and the [Profound Darkness] to a time loop using their copy of the Divergence Matrix. Afterwards the player and Matoi have a bittersweet reunion where they both swear to find a way to both save [Persona] and permanently kill the [Profound Darkness].

Earth Arc

Episode 4 
Three years after the events of EPISODE 3 and one year after the events of Phantasy Star Online 2 The Animation, the player is revived from stasis by the operator Xiera to accompany a new recruit named Hitsugi, a young boy, who is suspected to have ties to an internal invasion of fake ARKS members. During the mission, Hitsugi is attacked by a mysterious black mass; the player attempts to purify Hitsugi, but Hitsugi disappears prematurely. "Hitsugi" is revealed to be a high school girl from Earth playing the video game Phantasy Star Online 2, who finds a strange boy with her avatar's appearance in her room after the fiasco. Hitsugi names the boy "Al".

The player is sent to investigate Earth, where they discover that Earth uses a parallel mutation of Photons known as "Aether" that has the ability to resonate with the emotions of humans, and "Phantasy Star Online 2" is an espionage tool disguised as a video game to allow members of a mysterious group known as Mother Corps to interface with and infiltrate ARKS. Discovering that Mother Corps is secretly plotting against ARKS, the player allies themselves with Hitsugi and her brother Enga, a member of a secret organization opposing Mother Corps called "Earth Guide", and fights off various members of Mother Corps wreaking havoc across the globe. Hitsugi manifests a weapon constructed of Aether, the Ame-no-Habakiri, but during a confrontation against her best friend Kohri Wagashimiya, who was brainwashed by Mother Corps, it is destroyed. Kohri seemingly kills Hitsugi, but Al, revealed to be a Dark Falz, revives her, and Hitsugi is kidnapped and taken to the Moon.

The player and Enga rescue Hitsugi, but discover that the player's ARKS Ship had been attacked by Mother Corps. The player and Hitsugi return to the ship, where Hitsugi witnesses Mother, the leader of Mother Corps, assimilating Al, causing Hitsugi to awaken to her true Aether weapon, the Ame-no-Murakumo. The party returns to Earth, where Hitsugi uses her new weapon to save Kohri, and together the party confronts Mother on the Moon. Mother is revealed to be an imperfect copy of Xion discarded into space and seeks vengeance against the Photoners and ARKS. Mother is overwhelmed by the Dark Falz power she stole and transforms into a Dark Falz, but the party defeats her and returns her and Al to normal. However, the party is betrayed by Adam Sacrid, the leader of Earth Guide, who kills Mother and steals her powers.

The party, aided by the remaining Mother Corps members, confront Adam in the Earth Guide sanctuary, and witness him creating Yggdrasil in the Pacific Ocean. Adam takes the guise of a massive Phantasm monster called Deus Esca and seals the party's Aether powers while banishing the player back to the ARKS Ship. Al discovers that Mother's consciousness is still in his body, and Mother possesses him to return the player to Earth and restore the party's Aether powers. The party defeats Deus Esca and Adam, realizing the error of his ways, returns to normal before dying.

Photoner Arc

Episode 5 
During an attempt to destroy the [Profound Darkness] permanently by purifying [Persona], the player is sucked into an alternate dimension known as "Omega", where they rescue a young girl before escaping. Returning to the ARKS Ship, they are greeted by Alma, the deceased spirit of the first Klarisklays, who informs them that Omega is form of the fragmented Akashic Records, the source of all knowledge where Xion formerly resided, and has now manifested itself into a black hole threatening to consume the universe. In an attempt to stop the black hole, Alma grants the player the power to return to Omega at will by using her ability to stop time.

Upon their return, the player reunites with the girl, named Hariette, and discovers that the continent is plagued by a strange flower called Ephemera, a manifestation of the [Profound Darkness]'s corruption. The player unites with Hariette to put an end to various schemes across Omega instigated by a mysterious foe known as Elmir. They learn that the countries of Omega are associated strongly with the Dark Falz that they had encountered previously, and during their quest the player re-encounters and defeats each of the Falzes revived in some fashion by Elmir, in the process absorbing their consciousnesses.

Upon defeating the final Falz, Elmir is revealed to be an incarnation of Dark Falz [Persona], who manipulated the player into killing the Falz and returning their essences to Omega itself, revealed to be an incarnation of the [Profound Darkness]. Elmir kidnaps Hariette and seals her in a giant flower, attempting to use her and the combined Falz essences to destroy the outside world. With the help of Alma and allies from Omega, the player intervenes and defeats Elmir, killing him for good. Hariette is saved and pronounced the new goddess of Omega, and the player successfully seals the black hole.

Episode 6 
After returning to the ARKS Ship, the player and their allies are attacked by the Goddess of Annihilation, Shiva, a woman with an identical appearance to Hariette, and are unable to surmount her Photon-absorbing powers. Risa, a Class Trainer on the ARKS Ship, is revealed to be in possession of Hariette, who has reincarnated in the form of a Cosmogenic Arm in the real world, and they fend off Shiva. The player learns that Shiva is an artificial Photoner and Hariette's original body who was used to seal the original form of the [Profound Darkness], but was revived by the sealing of Omega and now desires revenge by destroying the universe.

Shiva mounts an attack against Mothership Xiao in a bid to steal it for herself; although ARKS is dispatched to defend against her, they are overwhelmed by her Luminmech forces and Xiao is seemingly killed, forcing ARKS to flee. The heroes return to Amduskia to revive Xiao by uniting a fragment of his power with Kasheena, a failed Xion clone whose body lies at the heart of the planet, warding off further direct attacks to Oracle.

The player and Matoi return to Harukotan to help Sukuna-hime fend off Shiva's attacks and eventually attempt to fight Shiva herself by using Sukuna-hime's power to seal Shiva's abilities. Although the attempt fails, Hariette learns from Sukuna-hime how to weaken Shiva by using a similar seal within Omega to affect her on a universal scale. Hariette remains in Omega to maintain the seal while the player and Risa return to the real world.

With Shiva weakened, ARKS mounts a last stand against Shiva's forces, with the player and Matoi leading the charge. Although the duo successfully reach Shiva, they are still greatly overwhelmed by her strength until Sukuna-hime intervenes at the last minute and gives them the power to deal the finishing blow. With her dying breath, Shiva transfers the essence of the [Profound Darkness] to the player, causing them to become the original form of the [Profound Darkness], the Primordial Darkness. Xion reaches out to the player and asks them to avert tragedy by traveling back to the beginning of time and becoming the Akashic Record, but the player, choosing to fight the Primordial Darkness, inspires Xion to reach out to Matoi, Hitsugi, and Hariette to unite their powers. The three heroines arrive and use the Ame-no-Murakumo to exorcise the Primordial Darkness from the player, and together they destroy the source of all evil in the universe once and for all, defeating Shiva in the process.

Development
According to Sega COO Naoya Tsurumi, Phantasy Star Online 2 took over five years to develop. Sega "pulled out all the stops", believing the game to be a crucial entry point into the growing free-to-play market on multiple devices. A cross-platform strategy involving PC, handhelds, and smartphones was made possible by the sharing of cloud data. Moreover, Tsurumi stated that the game would serve as a model for other intellectual properties as part of Sega's broader strategy "to further develop the whole of Asia as a single market." When Sega began thinking on how to expand the Phantasy Star franchise particularly in Japan where Final Fantasy and Dragon Quest were dominant, they decided on making it multiplatform and free-to-play without a charge upfront. A pay to win playstyle that was coming out of Korea and China at the time was not something Sega had in mind. They wanted to prove that they had a viable business model without compromising the quality.

On February 5, 2011, at the Phantasy Star Portable 2 Infinity Nationwide Fan Thanks Festival 2011 in Japan, Sega announced that the alpha test for Phantasy Star Online 2 would begin in the summer. They stated "Entry into the test will not be open; instead, all participants will be selected by lottery. And your first chance at putting your name into the drawing will be by purchasing Phantasy Star Portable 2 Infinity." On February 7, Sega listed alternate ways for users to enter into the lottery on the PSO2 website. The game was originally planned to have support in Japanese, English (US and UK), French, German, Italian, Spanish, Chinese and Korean with voices in Japanese. On March 9, 2012, Sony announced that Phantasy Star Online 2 would also be released on the PS Vita. On March 26, it was announced that the game would also appear on iOS and Android as Phantasy Star Online 2 es.

Open beta began on June 21, 2012, as free-to-play. Open beta ended on July 2, 2012, in preparation for release on July 4, 2012. Characters created by players during open beta were carried over to the live servers.

Episode 2 of Phantasy Star Online 2 launched on July 17, 2013, which introduced the new Deuman race and the Braver class. EPISODE 3 launched on August 27, 2014, which introduced the new Bouncer class and Casino, new skills for every class, new items, a new planet, and new quests. EPISODE 4 was released on January 27, 2016, and the main theme was revealed to be 'new experience'. It introduced even more advanced customization features, a new planet (Earth), and the brand-new Summoner class, which focuses on combat with pet creatures, as well as Graphic Tier 6, which featured enhanced graphics.

Release

Japanese release
The game was launched in Japan on July 4, 2012. The game was free to download and free-to-play, with an optional real money to in-game currency feature known as the "ARKS Cash" system. Sega also has released a retail version of the game on September 13, 2012, along with an installation disc bundled with extra bonuses and in-game items.

Southeast Asia release
Asiasoft released Phantasy Star Online 2 in Southeast Asia. The game was fully translated to English with huge changes to its menu, items and classes name. This is mainly to make the game much easier to understand for newcomers to the series. They also released a Thai language version of the game for Thailand players only. The closed beta for it began on April 10, 2014, with the official launch on May 29, 2014. Asiasoft announced they would also distribute Episode 2, which was released on March 5, 2015. However, on April 5, 2017, Asiasoft announced they would end servicing Phantasy Star Online 2 to Southeast Asia countries, including Thailand, on May 26, 2017.

There's also a Traditional Chinese version released in Taiwan and Hong Kong by Gamania, which also lasted for three years, before the server closed in early 2017.

Western and subsequent global release

It was speculated that the western release may have been cancelled in the later half of 2013. In November 2017, the English website for the game was taken down, along with any possibility of the game releasing on the west with it.

However, on June 9, 2019, a North American release was announced at Microsoft's E3 press conference, launching in spring 2020, with no initial plan for a release in Europe, Middle East and Africa. The game features cross-play between Xbox One and PC with Xbox Play Anywhere. On February 7 to 9, 2020, a three-day closed beta test phase was only playable on Xbox One. The reason for the long delay is because Sega did not have right infrastructure in place to operate a North American version.

The game's four week open beta test phase began on March 17, 2020, and concluded on April 14, 2020, to concede the official launch. The PC version launched on the Microsoft Store on May 27, 2020. The Steam version launches alongside EPISODE 4 on August 5, 2020. That same day, the Xbox One and Microsoft Store versions were released in Europe. On September 30, alongside EPISODE 5, the Steam version of the game added more playable regions for the game, with all regions (excluding Antilles, Belgium, Netherlands, China, Japan, and Republic of Korea) able to download and play the game, marking the global release of the game. The Epic Games Store version was released during EPISODE 6 on February 17, 2021. The PlayStation 4 version was released alongside PSO2 New Genesis on August 31, 2022. The global version removed three cutscenes involving three minors in a bathhouse, which was ultimately irrelevant to story or character development. However, later voicelines by the character Xiera commenting on these scenes had not been removed. It also edited a few cutscenes, as in which, Al and Hitsugi were naked in the Japanese version.

The global release features dual audio support with English and Japanese voiceovers, along with brand new English versions of the live concert tracks that are originally sung in Japanese, excluding those from the 3 collaborative live concert events (all of which are English only) (including songs that are sung by Quna (voiced in English by Kayli Mills and in Japanese by Eri Kitamura)). Takenobu Mitsuyoshi voices as himself and performed “We're ARKS!” in both English and Japanese. Furthermore, upon the release of the second chapter of PSO2NGS, both songs that are performed by Nadereh (voiced in English by Valeria Rodriguez and in Japanese by Azusa Tadokoro) will also feature an English version alongside a Japanese version. The global release also supports Japanese UI text and subtitles with plans of adding the UI text and subtitles in French, German, Italian, Spanish and Russian in the future.

Anime adaptation

An anime television series adaptation based on the game aired on TBS from January to March 2016. The adaptation was directed by Keiichiro Kawaguchi at Telecom Animation Film, with scripts written by Mitsutaka Hirota and music composed by Takashi Ōmama. The story is set one year prior to the events of EPISODE 4 and five years after the events of Phantasy Star Online 2 On Stage.

The opening theme is "Zessei Stargate" (絶世スターゲイト) by Shouta Aoi, and the ending theme is "Rare Drop☆KOI☆KOI! One More!" (レアドロ☆KOI☆こい！ワンモア！) by Rina Izumi (Ayaka Suwa) and Aika Suzuki (M.A.O). "Our Fighting" by Quna (Eri Kitamura) was used as the insert song in Episodes 2 and 11. Episode 4 featured three  songs: "Endless Story" (終わりなき物語) by Quna (Eri Kitamura), "Try to take me again" by Zeno (Ryōhei Kimura) and "Twin-Star Quality" (双子星クオリティ) by Pati (Kana Asumi) and Tia (Yuka Iguchi).

The anime is licensed by Sentai Filmworks in North America, and was simulcast by Crunchyroll.

A new anime television series titled Phantasy Star Online 2: Episode Oracle premiered on October 7, 2019, on Tokyo MX and BS11. The series recompiled the story of "Episodes 1-3" of the original game, and also included an original story. The 25-episode television series was directed by Masaki Tachibana at Gonzo, with scripts written by Hiroshi Ōnogi, Shigeru Morita, and Bunsei Asanuma, and characters designed by Shinpei Koikawa.

The opening themes are "Destiny" and "UniVerse", both performed by Aimee Blackschleger, and the ending themes are "Timeless Fortune" by Mika Arisaka, and "Soleli -Dear Destiny-" (それいゆ -Dear Destiny) by Haruko Momoi. All 3 ending themes for all 3 Episodes of the game ("Eternal Encore" (永遠のencore) by Quna (Eri Kitamura) in Episode 1 (also used as the insert song in Episode 9), "Living on like stars" by Mika Arisaka in Episode 2 and "Hello" by Monique Dehaney in Episode 3) are used as ending themes of Episodes 10, 18 and 25, respectively. "Our Fighting" by Quna (Eri Kitamura) was used as the insert song in Episodes 4, 10 and 16.

Phantasy Star Online 2: The Animation (2016)

Reception
Registered users for the game exceeded 2.5 million in March 2013. By August 2015, the game had over 3.5 million registered users. As of September 2016, the game has over 4.5 million users. Sega confirmed in 2018 that the PlayStation Vita version had 1.5 million downloads.

Famitsu gave the game a score of 33 out of 40, and the game won the Rookie of the Year 2012 WebMoney Award.

Sega released Phantasy Star Nova in 2014. The game shares similar elements to and is set in the same world as Phantasy Star Online 2, and is also part of the Online series. A novelisation, Phantasy Star Online 2 Side Story, began on June 15, 2014.

The North American release received mixed to positive reviews. IGN gave the game a score of a 7/10, praising the visuals, story, online capabilities, and gameplay, while criticizing the implementation of micro transactions.

References

External links

 
 
 

2016 anime television series debuts
2019 anime television series debuts
2012 video games
Active massively multiplayer online games
Android (operating system) games
Cloud-based Nintendo Switch games
Free-to-play video games
Funimation
Gonzo (company)
IOS games
Massively multiplayer online role-playing games
Muse Communication
Nintendo Switch games
Phantasy Star video games
PlayStation 4 games
PlayStation Vita games
Science fiction massively multiplayer online role-playing games
Sega video games
Sentai Filmworks
Third-person shooters
TMS Entertainment
Video games with cross-platform play
Windows games
Xbox One games
Lua (programming language)-scripted video games
Action role-playing video games
Video games developed in Japan
Asiasoft games